Helju Mikkel (until 1936 Amberg, 1936-1948 Ambre, colloquially in Estonian Tantsumemm, Memm; 13 March 1925 – October 2017) was an Estonian folk dance personnel.

She was one of the founders of the dance festival Gaudeamus. She was a long-time leader of University of Tartu Folk Art Ensemble.

She set many new Estonian folk dances, e.g. Tedremäng, Vanaisa polka, Otsapandjatse, Lina, Kullaketrajad, Kiigemäng and Kaksteist kapukat.

Awards:
 1964: Estonian SSR merited cultural personnel
 2000: Order of the White Star, III class.

References

1925 births
2017 deaths
Estonian dancers
Estonian choreographers